In the United States, a county or county equivalent is an administrative or political subdivision of a state that consists of a geographic region with specific boundaries and usually some level of governmental authority. The term "county" is used in 48 states, while Louisiana and Alaska have functionally equivalent subdivisions called parishes and boroughs, respectively. The specific governmental powers of counties vary widely between the states, with many providing some level of services to civil townships, municipalities, and unincorporated areas. Certain municipalities are in multiple counties; New York City is uniquely partitioned into five counties, referred to at the city government level as boroughs. Some municipalities have consolidated with their county government to form consolidated city-counties, or have been legally separated from counties altogether to form independent cities. Conversely, those counties in Connecticut, Rhode Island, eight of Massachusetts's 14 counties, and Alaska's Unorganized Borough have no government power, existing only as geographic distinctions.

The United States Census Bureau uses the term "county equivalent" to describe places that are comparable to counties, but called by different names. Louisiana parishes, the organized boroughs of Alaska, independent cities, and the District of Columbia are equivalent to counties for administrative purposes. Alaska's Unorganized Borough is further divided into 11 census areas that are statistically equivalent to counties. In 2024, the U.S. Census Bureau will start to also count Connecticut's Councils of Governments, which took over some of the regional powers from the state's former county governments, as county equivalents.

Territories of the United States do not have counties; instead, the United States Census Bureau also divides them into county equivalents. The U.S. Census Bureau counts American Samoa's districts and atolls as county equivalents. American Samoa locally has places called "counties", but these entities are considered to be "minor civil divisions" (not true counties) by the U.S. Census Bureau.

The number of counties per state ranges from the three counties of Delaware to the 254 counties of Texas. County populations also vary widely: in 2017, according to the Census Bureau, more than half the U.S. population is concentrated in just 143 of the more than 3,000 counties, or just 4.6% of all counties; the five most populous counties, ordered from most to least, are Los Angeles County, California; Cook County, Illinois; Harris County, Texas; Maricopa County, Arizona; and San Diego County, California.  

, there are currently 3,143 counties and county equivalents in the 50 states and the District of Columbia. If the 100 county equivalents in the U.S. territories are counted, then the total is 3,243 counties and county equivalents in the United States. The county with the largest population, Los Angeles County (10,039,107), and the county with the 12th largest land area, San Bernardino County, border each other in Southern California (eleven boroughs in Alaska are larger in area than San Bernardino County).

History
The origin of the American counties are in the counties of England. English (after 1707 British) colonists brought to their colonies in North America a political subdivision that they already used in the British metropole: the counties. Counties were among the earliest units of local government established in the Thirteen Colonies that would become the United States. Virginia created the first counties in order to ease the administrative workload in Jamestown. The House of Burgesses divided the colony first into four "incorporations" in 1617 and finally into eight shires (or counties) in 1634: James City, Henrico, Charles City, Charles River, Warrosquyoake, Accomac, Elizabeth City, and Warwick River. America's oldest intact county court records can be found at Eastville, Virginia, in Northampton (originally Accomac) County, dating to 1632. Maryland established its first county, St. Mary's, in 1637, and Massachusetts followed in 1643. Pennsylvania and New York delegated significant power and responsibility from the colony government to county governments and thereby established a pattern for most of the United States, although counties remained relatively weak in New England.

When independence came, the framers of the Constitution left the matter to the states. Subsequently, state constitutions conceptualized county governments as arms of the state. Louisiana instead adopted the local divisions called parishes that dated back to both the Spanish colonial and French colonial periods when the land was dominated by the Catholic Church. In the twentieth century, the role of local governments strengthened and counties began providing more services, acquiring home rule and county commissions to pass local ordinances pertaining to their unincorporated areas. In 1955, delegates to the Alaska Constitutional Convention wanted to avoid the traditional county system and adopted their own unique model with different types of boroughs varying in powers and duties.

In some states, these powers are partly or mostly devolved to the counties' smaller divisions usually called townships, though in New York, New England and Wisconsin they are called "towns". The county may or may not be able to override its townships on certain matters, depending on state law.

The newest county in the United States is the city and county of Broomfield, Colorado, established in 2001 as a consolidated city-county, previously part of four counties. The newest county equivalents are the Alaskan census areas of Chugach and Copper River, both established in 2019, and the Alaskan boroughs of Petersburg established in 2013, Wrangell established in 2008, and Skagway established in 2007.

County variations

Consolidated city-counties

A consolidated city-county is simultaneously a city, which is a municipality (municipal corporation), and a county, which is an administrative division of a state, having the powers and responsibilities of both types of entities. The city limit or jurisdiction is synonymous with the county line, as the two administrative entities become a non-dichotomous single entity. For this reason, a consolidated city-county is officially remarked as name of city – name of county (i.e., Augusta–Richmond County in Georgia). The same is true of the boroughs of New York City, each of which is coextensive with a county of New York State. For those entities in which the city uses the same name as the county, city and county of name may be used (i.e., City and County of Denver in Colorado).

Similarly, some of Alaska's boroughs have merged with their principal cities, creating unified city-boroughs. Some such consolidations and mergers have created cities that rank among the geographically largest cities in the world, though often with population densities far below those of most urban areas.

There are 40 consolidated city-counties in the U.S., including Augusta–Richmond County; the City and County of Denver, Colorado; the City and County of Honolulu, Hawaii; Indianapolis–Marion County, Indiana; Jacksonville–Duval County, Florida; Louisville–Jefferson County, Kentucky; Lexington–Fayette County, Kentucky; Kansas City–Wyandotte County, Kansas; Nashville–Davidson County, Tennessee; New Orleans–Orleans Parish, Louisiana; the City and County of Philadelphia, Pennsylvania; and the City and County of San Francisco, California.

A consolidated city-county may still contain independent municipalities maintaining some governmental powers that did not merge with the rest of the county. For example, the government of Jacksonville–Duval County, Florida, still provides county-level services to the four independent municipalities within its borders: Atlantic Beach, Baldwin, Jacksonville Beach, and Neptune Beach.

County equivalents
The term county equivalents is used by the United States Census Bureau to describe divisions that are comparable to counties but called by different names:
 Alaska boroughs: the state adopted the term "borough" instead of "county" to reflect Alaska's system with different classes of boroughs varying in governmental powers.
 Alaska census areas: most of the land area of Alaska is not contained within any of Alaska's 19 organized boroughs. This vast area, larger than France and Germany combined, is officially referred to by the Alaska state government as the Unorganized Borough and outside of other incorporated borough limits, has no independent "county" government, although several incorporated city governments exist within its boundaries; the majority of it is governed and run by the State of Alaska as an extension of state government. The United States Census Bureau, in cooperation with the Alaska state government for census and electoral districting purposes, has divided the Unorganized Borough into 11 census areas for statistical purposes only.
 Louisiana parishes: the usage of the term "parish" for a territorial entity or local government in Louisiana dates back to both the Spanish colonial and French colonial periods when the land was dominated by the Catholic Church. New Orleans is a consolidated city-parish. 
 Independent cities: these are cities that legally belong to no county. They differ from consolidated city-counties in that in the case of a consolidated city-county, the county at least nominally exists, whereas in the case of an independent city, no county even nominally exists. There are 41 such cities in the United States: Baltimore, Maryland; Carson City, Nevada; St. Louis, Missouri; and all 38 cities in Virginia, where any area incorporated as a city is outside of the county jurisdiction.
 Washington, D.C., outside the jurisdiction of any state, has a special status. The City of Washington comprises the entirety of the District of Columbia, which, in accordance with Article 1, Section 8 of the U.S. Constitution, is under the jurisdiction of the U.S. Congress. When founded in 1801, the District consisted of two counties and three cities. In 1846, Alexandria County (which now forms Arlington County and a portion of the independent city of Alexandria)—including the then City of Alexandria—was given back to Virginia. In 1871, the three remaining entities—the City of Washington, City of Georgetown, and Washington County (which was coterminous with the district)—were merged into a consolidated government of District of Columbia by an act of Congress. Georgetown was abolished as a city by another act in 1895.
 Connecticut councils of governments (beginning in 2024): county governments were abolished in Connecticut in 1960.  Regional councils of governments (COG's) have since been developed as a means of cooperation and coordination between municipalities.  Application for the COG's to be considered county equivalents for statistical purposes was made to the Census Bureau in 2019, approved in 2022, and will be fully implemented by 2024.

Consolidated city-counties are not designated county equivalents for administrative purposes; since both the city and the county at least nominally exist, they are properly classified as counties in their own right. Likewise, the boroughs of New York City are coextensive with counties and are therefore by definition also not county equivalents.

Territories

There are technically no counties in U.S. territories. American Samoa has its own counties, but the U.S. Census Bureau does not treat them as counties (instead, the U.S. Census Bureau treats American Samoa's three districts and two atolls as county equivalents). American Samoa's counties are treated as minor civil divisions. Most territories are directly divided into municipalities or similar units, which are treated as equivalent of counties for statistical purposes:

 The 78 municipalities of Puerto Rico
 The 2 districts of the United States Virgin Islands, or the 3 main islands of the United States Virgin Islands
 The 19 villages of Guam
 The 4 municipalities of the Northern Mariana Islands
 The 3 districts of American Samoa
 The 2 atolls of American Samoa
 The 9 islands of the U.S. Minor Outlying Islands

The U.S. Census Bureau counts all of Guam as one county equivalent (with the FIPS code 66010), while the USGS counts Guam's election districts (villages) as county equivalents. The U.S. Census Bureau counts the 3 main islands in the U.S. Virgin Islands as county equivalents, while the USGS counts the districts of the U.S. Virgin Islands (of which there are 2) as county equivalents.

Names and etymologies

Common sources of county names are names of people, geographic features, places in other states or countries, and animals. Quite a few counties bear names of Native American, French, or Spanish origin.

Counties are most often named for people, often political figures or early settlers, with over 2,100 of the 3,144 total so named. The most common county name, with 31, is Washington County, for America's first president, George Washington. Up until 1871, there was a Washington County within the District of Columbia, but it was dissolved by the District of Columbia Organic Act. Jefferson County, for Thomas Jefferson, is next with 26. The most recent president to have a county named for him was Warren G. Harding, reflecting the slowing rate of county creation since New Mexico and Arizona became states in 1912. The most common names for counties not named after a president are Franklin (25), Clay (18), and Montgomery (18).

After people, the next most common source of county names are geographic features and locations, with some counties even being named after counties in other states, or for places in countries such as the United Kingdom. The most common geographic county name is Lake. Words from Native American languages, as well as the names of Native American leaders and tribes, lend their names to many counties. Quite a few counties bear names of French or Spanish origin, such as Marquette County being named after French missionary Father Jacques Marquette.

The county's equivalent in the state of Louisiana, the parish (Fr. paroisse civile and Sp. parroquia) took its name during the state's French and Spanish colonial periods. Before the Louisiana Purchase and granting of statehood, government was often administered in towns where major church parishes were located. Of the original 19 civil parishes of Louisiana that date from statehood in 1807, nine were named after the Roman Catholic parishes from which they were governed.

County government

Organization 
The structure and powers of a county government may be defined by the general law of the state or by a charter specific to that county. States may allow only general-law counties, only charter counties, or both. Generally, general-law local governments have less autonomy than chartered local governments.

Counties are usually governed by an elected body, variously called the county commission, board of supervisors, commissioners' court, county council, county court, or county Legislature. In cases in which a consolidated city-county or independent city exists, a city council usually governs city/county or city affairs. In some counties, day-to-day operations are overseen by an elected county executive or by a chief administrative officer or county administrator who reports to the board, the mayor, or both.

In many states, the board in charge of a county holds powers that transcend all three traditional branches of government. It has the legislative power to enact ordinances for the county; it has the executive power to oversee the executive operations of county government; and it has quasi-judicial power with regard to certain limited matters (such as hearing appeals from the planning commission if one exists).

In many states, several important officials are elected separately from the board of commissioners or supervisors and cannot be fired by the board. These positions may include county clerk, county treasurer, county surrogate, sheriff, and others.

District attorneys or state attorneys are usually state-level as opposed to county-level officials, but in many states, counties and state judicial districts have coterminous boundaries.

The site of a county's administration, and often the county courthouse, is generally called the county seat ("parish seat" in Louisiana, "borough seat" in Alaska, or "shire town" in several New England counties). The county seat usually resides in a municipality. However, some counties may have multiple seats or no seat. In some counties with no incorporated municipalities, a large settlement may serve as the county seat.

Scope of power
The power of county governments varies widely from state to state, as does the relationship between counties and incorporated cities.

The powers of counties arise from state law and vary widely.
In Connecticut and Rhode Island,
counties are geographic entities, but not governmental jurisdictions. At the other extreme, Maryland counties and the county equivalent City of Baltimore handle almost all services, including public education, although the state retains an active oversight authority with many of these services. Counties in Hawaii also handle almost all services since there is no formal level of government (municipality, public education, or otherwise) existing below that of the county in the state.

In most Midwestern and Northeastern states, counties are further subdivided into townships or towns, which sometimes exercise local powers or administration. Throughout the United States, counties may contain other independent, self-governing municipalities.

Minimal scope
In New England, counties function at most as judicial court districts and sheriff's departments (presently, in Connecticut only as judicial court districts—and in Rhode Island, they have lost both those functions and most others but they are still used by the United States Census Bureau and some other federal agencies for some federal functions), and most of the governmental authority below the state level is in the hands of towns and cities. In several of Maine's sparsely populated counties, small towns rely on the county for law enforcement, and in New Hampshire several social programs are administered at the state level. In Connecticut, Rhode Island, and parts of Massachusetts, counties are now only geographic designations, and they do not have any governmental powers. All government is either done at the state level or at the municipal level. In Connecticut and parts of Massachusetts, regional councils have been established to partially fill the void left behind by the abolished county governments. The regional councils' authority is limited compared with a county government—they have authority only over infrastructure and land use planning, distribution of state and federal funds for infrastructure projects, emergency preparedness, and limited law enforcement duties.

Moderate scope
In the Mid-Atlantic and Midwest, counties typically provide, at a minimum, courts, public utilities, libraries, hospitals, public health services, parks, roads, law enforcement, and jails. There is usually a county registrar, recorder, or clerk (the exact title varies) who collects vital statistics, holds elections (sometimes in coordination with a separate elections office or commission), and prepares or processes certificates of births, deaths, marriages, and dissolutions (divorce decrees). The county recorder normally maintains the official record of all real estate transactions. Other key county officials include the coroner/medical examiner, treasurer, assessor, auditor, comptroller, and district attorney.

In most states, the county sheriff is the chief law enforcement officer in the county. However, except in major emergencies where clear chains of command are essential, the county sheriff normally does not directly control the police departments of city governments, but merely cooperates with them (e.g., under mutual aid pacts). Thus, the most common interaction between county and city law enforcement personnel is when city police officers deliver suspects to sheriff's deputies for detention or incarceration in the county jail.

In most states, the state courts and local law enforcement are organized and implemented along county boundaries, but nearly all of the substantive and procedural law adjudicated in state trial courts originates from the state legislature and state appellate courts. In other words, most criminal defendants are prosecuted for violations of state law, not local ordinances, and if they, the district attorney, or police seek reforms to the criminal justice system, they will usually have to direct their efforts towards the state legislature rather than the county (which merely implements state law). 

A typical criminal defendant will be arraigned and subsequently indicted or held over for trial before a trial court in and for a particular county where the crime occurred, kept in the county jail (if he is not granted bail or cannot make bail), prosecuted by the county's district attorney, and tried before a jury selected from that county. But long-term incarceration is rarely a county responsibility, execution of capital punishment is never a county responsibility, and the state's responses to prisoners' appeals are the responsibility of the state attorney general, who has to defend before the state appellate courts the prosecutions conducted by locally elected district attorneys in the name of the state. Furthermore, county-level trial court judges are officers of the judicial branch of the state government rather than county governments.

In many states, the county controls all unincorporated lands within its boundaries. In states with a township tier, unincorporated land is controlled by the townships. Residents of unincorporated land who are dissatisfied with county-level or township-level resource allocation decisions can attempt to vote to incorporate as a city, town, or village.

A few counties directly provide public transportation themselves, usually in the form of a simple bus system. However, in most counties, public transportation is provided by one of the following: a special district that is coterminous with the county (but exists separately from the county government), a multi-county regional transit authority, or a state agency.

Broad scope
In western and southern states, more populated counties provide many facilities, such as airports, convention centers, museums, recreation centers,
beaches, harbors, zoos, clinics, law libraries, and public housing. They provide services such as child and family services, elder services, mental health services, welfare services, veterans assistance services, animal control, probation supervision, historic preservation, food safety regulation, and environmental health services. They have many additional officials like public defenders, arts commissioners, human rights commissioners, and planning commissioners. 

There may be a county fire department and a county police department – as distinguished from fire and police departments operated by individual cities, special districts, or the state government. For example, Gwinnett County, Georgia, and its county seat, the city of Lawrenceville, each have their own police departments. (A separate county sheriff's department is responsible for security of the county courts and administration of the county jail.) In several southern states, public school systems are organized and administered at the county level.

Statistics

, there were 3,007 counties, 64 Louisiana parishes, 19 organized boroughs and 11 census areas in Alaska, 41 independent cities, and the District of Columbia for a total of 3,143 counties and county equivalents in the 50 states and District of Columbia. There are an additional 100 county equivalents in the territories of the United States. The average number of counties per state is 62, with a range from the three counties of Delaware to the 254 counties of Texas.

Southern and Midwestern states generally tend to have more counties than Western or Northeastern states, as many Northeastern states are not large enough in area to warrant a large number of counties, and many Western states were sparsely populated when counties were created by their respective state legislatures. The five counties of Rhode Island, the eight counties of Connecticut, and eight of the 14 counties of Massachusetts no longer have functional county governments, but continue to exist as legal and census entities.

Population
The average U.S. county population was 104,435 in 2019, while the median county, which is Nicholas County, West Virginia, had a population of 25,965 in 2019. The most populous county is Los Angeles County, California, with 10,014,009 residents in 2020. This number is greater than the populations of 41 U.S. states. It also makes the population of Los Angeles County 17.4 times greater than that of the least populous state, Wyoming.

The second most populous county is Cook County, Illinois, with a population of 5,275,541. Cook County's population is larger than that of 28 individual U.S. states and the combined populations of the six smallest states.

The least populous county is Loving County, Texas, with 64 residents in 2020. Eight county equivalents in the U.S. territories have no human population: Rose Atoll, Northern Islands Municipality, Baker Island, Howland Island, Jarvis Island, Johnston Atoll, Kingman Reef, and Navassa Island. The remaining three islands in the U.S. Minor Outlying Islands (Midway Atoll, Palmyra Atoll and Wake Island) have small non-permanent human populations. The county equivalent with the smallest non-zero population counted in the census is Swains Island, American Samoa (17 people), although since 2008 this population has not been permanent either.

The most densely populated county or county equivalent is New York County, New York (coextensive with the New York City Borough of Manhattan), with 72,033 persons per square mile (27,812/km2) in 2015. The Yukon–Koyukuk Census Area, Alaska, is both the most extensive and the least densely populated county or county equivalent with 0.0380 persons per square mile (0.0147/km2) in 2015.

In the 50 states (plus District of Columbia), a total of 981 counties have a population over 50,000; 592 counties have a population over 100,000; 137 counties have a population over 500,000; 45 counties have a population over 1,000,000; and 14 counties have a population over 2,000,000. At the other extreme, 35 counties have a population under 1,000; 307 counties have a population under 5,000; 709 counties have a population under 10,000; and 1,492 counties have a population between 10,000 and 50,000.

Area

Counties in the western United States typically have a much larger land area than those in the eastern United States.

The most extensive county or county equivalent is the Yukon–Koyukuk Census Area, Alaska, with a land area of 145,505 square miles (376,856 km2). All nine of the most extensive county equivalents are in Alaska. The most extensive county is San Bernardino County, California, with a land area of 20,057 square miles (51,947 km2). The least extensive county is Kalawao County, Hawaii, with a land area of 11.991 square miles (31.058 km2). The least extensive county equivalent in the 50 states is the independent city of Falls Church, Virginia, with a land area of 1.999 square miles (5.177 km2). If U.S. territories are included, the least extensive county equivalent is Kingman Reef, with a land area of 0.01 square miles (0.03 km2).

Geographic relationships between cities and counties
In some states, a municipality may be in only one county and may not annex territory in adjacent counties, but in the majority of states, the state constitution or state law allows municipalities to extend across county boundaries. At least 32 states include municipalities in multiple counties. Dallas and Oklahoma City, for example, both contain portions of five counties. New York City is an unusual case because it encompasses multiple entire counties in one city. Each of those counties is coextensive with one of the five boroughs of the city: Manhattan (New York County), The Bronx (Bronx County), Queens (Queens County), Brooklyn (Kings County), and Staten Island (Richmond County).

See also
Index of U.S. counties
Lists of counties in the United States
List of United States counties and county equivalents
Consolidated city-county
List of former United States counties
List of highest counties in the United States
List of highest U.S. county high points
List of the most common U.S. county names
List of FIPS codes
Census geographic units of Canada
Municipalities of Mexico

Notes

References

External links

 Geographic Areas Reference Manual by the United States Census Bureau
 National Association of Counties
 Atlas of Historical County Boundaries 
 Where Americans are moving, by county, in 2010

 
United States 2
Counties, United States
Political divisions of the United States